Julia Schwaiger (born 21 January 1996) is an Austrian biathlete. She represented Austria at the Biathlon World Championships 2015 in Kontiolahti.

Julia works in omicron electronics in klaus.

References

External links 
 

1996 births
Living people
Austrian female biathletes
People from Zell am See
Sportspeople from Salzburg (state)
Biathletes at the 2022 Winter Olympics
Olympic biathletes of Austria